"Celle qui m'a tout appris" (meaning "The One Who Taught Me Everything") is a song recorded by Canadian singer Celine Dion, released in April 2014 as the first single from Céline une seule fois / Live 2013 (2014). It was written by Nina Bouraoui and Jacques Veneruso, and produced by Veneruso and Thierry Blanchard, and originally featured on Sans attendre (2012). "Celle qui m'a tout appris" received favorable reviews from music critics.

Background and release
The lyrics and thirty-second previews of all songs from Sans attendre were posted on Dion's official website on 18 October 2012. "Celle qui m'a tout appris" became available as a digital download from Sans attendre in early November 2012. On 8 April 2014, it was sent to radio in France as the fourth single from Sans attendre and first from Céline une seule fois / Live 2013. On 29 April 2014, the song was also released to Canadian radio stations.

Composition
The song was written by Nina Bouraoui and Jacques Veneruso, while production was handled by Veneruso and Thierry Blanchard. Nina Bouraoui worked with Dion in 2007 on D'elles writing lyrics for "Immensité" and "Les paradis". Veneruso wrote and produced many French-language hits for Dion, including: "Sous le vent," "Tout l'or des hommes," "Contre nature," "Je ne vous oublie pas," "Tous les secrets" and "Immensité". On Sans attendre he also wrote commercially successful "Parler à mon père" and produced seven songs. Thierry Blanchard co-produced "A cause" on D'elles and co-produced four songs on Sans attendre: "Celle qui m'a tout appris," "Je n'ai pas besoin d'amour," "Que toi au monde" and "Tant de temps". With "Celle qui m'a tout appris," Dion pays tribute to her mother Thérèse Dion.

Critical reception
The song received generally positive reviews from music critics. Alain de Repentigny from La Presse praised "Celle qui m'a tout appris" with lyrics by Nina Bouraoui, calling it one of the best songs on the album, a stand out. Kieron Tyler from The Arts Desk wrote that the most striking thing about Sans attendre is its restraint, calling it a "swirling" song that "could have transformed itself into a power ballad, but instead it's about the melody and mood".

Music video
On 6 May 2014, the live performance of "Celle qui m'a tout appris" was uploaded onto Dion's official Vevo channel. It was taken from her sold-out, Celine... une seule fois concert in Quebec City on 27 July 2013.

Live performances
Dion performed "Celle qui m'a tout appris" during the Quebec television special, Céline Dion… Sans attendre aired on 4 November 2012. The song was also performed during the Céline... une seule fois concert in Quebec City on 27 July 2013, as well as the Sans attendre Tour which started in Belgium on 21 November 2013 and ended in France on 5 December 2013.

Charts

Credits and personnel
Recording
 Dion's vocal recorded at Echo Beach Studios, Jupiter, Florida
 Mixed at Hauts de Gammes Studio, Paris

Personnel

 songwriting – Nina Bouraoui, Jacques Veneruso
 production and arrangements – Jacques Veneruso, Thierry Blanchard
 vocal recording – François Lalonde
 recording assistant – Ray Holznecht
 recording and mixing – Thierry Blanchard
 guitars – Jacques Veneruso, Cyril Tarquiny
 keyboards, programming – Thierry Blanchard
 piano – Emanuel Guerrero
 drums – Laurent Coppola
 bass – Jean-Marc Haroutiounian
 background vocals – Jacques Veneruso, Agnès Puget, Delphine Elbé

Release history

References

2014 singles
2012 songs
Celine Dion songs
Columbia Records singles
French-language songs
Songs written by Jacques Veneruso
Songs written by Nina Bouraoui